Acheilognathus meridianus is a species of freshwater ray-finned fish in the genus Acheilognathus.  It is endemic to China and northern Vietnam.  It grows to a maximum length of 10.0 cm.

References

Acheilognathus
Fish described in 1939